The Court of Appeal in Ireland was created by the Parliament of the United Kingdom of Great Britain and Ireland under the Supreme Court of Judicature Act (Ireland) 1877 as the final appellate court within Ireland, then under British rule. A last appeal from this court could be taken to the House of Lords in London.

Personnel

 The Lord Chancellor of Ireland was President of the Court of Appeal. As in England, the full-time judges had the title Lord Justice of Appeal. Other senior judges such as the Chief Baron of the Irish Exchequer, sat as additional judges of appeal when required.

The following judges held the title of Lord Justice of the Court of Appeal in Ireland from the Court's creation in 1878 to the abolition of the pre-Independence Courts in 1924.

Partition

The Court of Appeal in Ireland was replaced by separate Courts of Appeal in Northern and Southern Ireland, along with a High Court of Appeal for Ireland, hearing appeals from both, under the United Kingdom's Government of Ireland Act 1920. The High Court of Appeal for Ireland was short-lived, and only heard a handful of cases before being abolished under the Irish Free State (Consequential Provisions) Act 1922.

Abolition

In the Irish Free State, the Courts of Justice Act 1924 replaced the Court of Appeal in Southern Ireland with a Supreme Court of Justice under the Constitution of the Irish Free State, and a Court of Criminal Appeal to hear criminal appeals that would have been heard by the Court of Appeal's Criminal Division.

Final appellate jurisdiction was transferred from the House of Lords to the Judicial Committee of the Privy Council - which was then abolished in 1933 by the Constitution (Amendment No. 22) Act 1933.

A Court of Appeal in Northern Ireland was re-created under the Judicature (Northern Ireland) Act 1978.

Reputation

During the first three decades of its existence, the reputation of the Court of Appeal was very high, probably higher than that of any other tribunal in Irish legal history. Maurice Healy, writing in 1939, thought that the Court as it was constituted in the early 1900s  "could compare with any college of justice in history". V.T.H. Delaney, writing in 1960, believed that all Irish barristers would choose the old Court of Appeal as representing the Irish judiciary at their best. This reputation depended largely on the quality of the individual judges: Christopher Palles is still often called "the greatest of Irish judges", and Gerald FitzGibbon, Hugh Holmes and Lord Ashbourne were his intellectual equals. Unfortunately, when these men were gone, there was a problem in finding replacements of equal calibre, and from about 1916, after the death of Fitzgibbon, and the retirement of Holmes and Palles, the reputation of the Court declined. In its last years, according to Healy, the judges were notable only for their constant quarrelling among themselves, and in 1924 the new Irish Free State forcibly retired them all.

References

Ireland
Appeal
1877 establishments in the United Kingdom
1924 disestablishments in Ireland
Courts and tribunals established in 1877
Courts and tribunals disestablished in 1924